Centenary Bank is a commercial bank in Uganda licensed by the Bank of Uganda, the central bank and national banking regulator.

History 

The bank was founded in 1983 as a credit trust, Centenary Rural Development Trust (CRDT), by Simeon Lutaakome, Hugh Francis Pulle, Paul Kateregga, Vincent Kirabo kya Maria, Emmanuel Mpande, and John Ogutu. In 1985, CRDT began to provide financial services to the public. The bank became a fully licensed commercial bank in 1993, after receiving a license from the Bank of Uganda. As of May 2016, Centenary Bank was the largest majority indigenous Ugandan commercial bank.

In May 2009, John Giles left the seat of Managing Director after three years at the position. In 2011, the Centenary Bank launched a program with the World Bank Group to develop loans in the Ugandan agricultural sector.

In 2017, Centenary launched on a new core banking platform developed by the Greek company Intrasoft International S.A. and signed a partnership with Mastercard to develop a broad suite of new mobile banking solutions. In December 2017, the Centenary Bank signed a deal with WorldRemit to allow transfer from the remittance service. In May 2020, the bank launched instant paperless accounts for the unbanked Ugandan population.

Overview

The bank is a large financial services provider in Uganda primarily involved in the promotion of development through loans to rural farmers, processors of agricultural produce, small traders, small manufacturers, importers, and exporters. While engaged in all areas of commercial banking, the bank has a significant portion of its portfolio in the microfinance arena in an attempt to meet the needs of the many individuals and business entities with limited means. As of December 2021, the bank's assets were UGX:4.8 trillion (US$1.359 billion), with shareholders' equity of USh789.52 billion (US$222.78 million).

, Centenary Bank had its headquarters in Kampala. Its headquarters building is Mapeera House, on Kampala Road opposite City Square. The bank had a network of 63 bank branches together with 157 linked automated teller machines at 115 locations in the  Central, Western, Northern, and Eastern Regions. The bank had 1,493,554 deposit accounts.

Partnerships
In December 2021, Centenary Bank unveiled a Cente Platinum Mastercard, a debit card for its premium customers.

Ownership
, the bank's stock was privately owned by the following corporate entities and individuals:

See also
 Banking in Uganda
 List of banks in Uganda
 List of tallest buildings in Kampala
 Asset allocation among commercial banks in Uganda
Mapeera House

References

External links
  Centenary Bank Website
  History of Centenary Bank

Banks of Uganda
Kampala Central Division
Banks established in 1983
1983 establishments in Uganda
Companies based in Kampala
Centenary Bank
Centenary Group